The Germany national under-18 rugby union team is the under-18 team of the Germany national rugby union team in the sport of rugby union.

Overview
The German team has, for the most part, played in the B-Division of the European Under-18 Rugby Union Championship, however, it earned promotion to the A-Division in 2009.

2009
The German team earned promotion to the A division of the European championship at the 2009  tournament in southern France. It had won promotion to the elite division of European under-18 rugby for the first time in many years. Germany beat Portugal 11-3 in the final of the B tournament to clinch promotion.

The German team took part in the tournament with the following squad:
 Julius Nostadt, Tim Menzel, Chris Hilsenbeck (US Colomiers), Tom Schiiling (RK 03 Berlin), Samy Füchsel (Berliner RC), Fabian Tacke, Kevin Nelson (SC Germania List), Jörn Schröder (TSV Victoria Linden), Elmar Heimpel, Nicolas Kurzer, Bastian Himmer, Robert Hittel, Luis Becker, Raffael Ruck (RG Heidelberg), Dustin Dobravsky (Canada), Timo Vollenkemper (Wiedenbrücker TV), Sam Rainger (RK Heusenstamm), Matthias Marin, Sebastian Kößler, Konstantin Hoffmann (TSV Handschuhsheim), Michail Tyumenev, Nicolas Müller, Dennis Denzin, Phil Szczesny (DSV 78 Hannover), Chris Kleebauer (Gloucester), Pascal Drügemöller (SC Neuenheim), Jerome Ruhnau (TuS 95 Düsseldorf).

2010
In the 2010 edition of the European under-18 rugby union championship, the team, freshly promoted to the A group, pulled off a surprise 44-0 victory over Romania. Germany lost its opening game to eventual runners-up Ireland 20-11, but managed to win its second game, against Romania, 44-0. In its third and final game in the tournament, against Italy for fifth place, Germany lost 18-13. Chris Thau, Publications Manager of the IRB, commented after the Romania game that it was the first time in the almost 40 years he had been watching German national teams, that a German team played world class rugby.

The German team, coached by Jan Ceselka (TSV Handschuhsheim) and Christian Lill (RK 03 Berlin), took part in the tournament with the following squad:
 Nicolas Kurzer, Robert Hittel, Hannes Huber, Matthias Kunzmann (Heidelberger TV), Sebastian Kößler (TSV Handschuhsheim), Elmar Heimpel, Luis Becker (RG Heidelberg), Pascal Drügemöller (SC Neuenheim), Phil Szczesny, Nicolas Müller, Adrian de Riz, Pascal Fischer (DSV 78 Hannover), Jörn Schröder (TSV Victoria Linden), Fabian Tacke, Kevin Nelson, Kevin Riege (SC Germania List), Samy Füchsel (Berliner RC), Lukas Deichmann, Jens Listmann, Adam Howes (SC 1880 Frankfurt), Kilian Kleine (Coventry R.F.C.), Julius Nostadt, Chris Hilsenbeck, Tim Menzel (US Colomiers), Eddie Mallaby (Harlequin F.C.), Robin Plümpe (Waiheke Island RFC).

2011
Germany won its opening game of the 2011, defeating Belgium 27-11 and thereby achieving the teams aim of not being relegated. The team then suffered a heavy 3-87 defeat against Scotland, a game that clearly showed the difference between the standards of rugby between the two nations. In the final game of the tournament, Germany lost 0-40 to Georgia and finished fourth in its division.

Germany called up the following players for the 2011 tournament:
 Adrian de Riz, Daniel Windolf, Nico Kretschmer, Felix Schippe (DSV 78 Hannover), Kevin Riege (SC Germania List), Robin Brömer, Hasan Tekkal (TSV Victoria Linden), Sebastian Fromm (Clongowes Wood College), Marc Hittel, Vincent Fischer, Carsten Lang (RG Heidelberg), Leonard Becker, Luca Hoffmann (SC Neuenheim), Frederick Lüthke (Stuttgarter RC), Ali Sürer (TB Rohrbach), Max Utikal (RK Heusenstamm), Lukas Deichmann, Jens Listmann (SC 1880 Frankfurt), Philipp Gerigk (ASV Köln Rugby), Julius König (Wald-Merscheider TV), Theodor Lorenz Schmidt-Bleek, Lukas Wende, Maxim Gazzo (Berliner RC), Kilian Kleine, Eddy Mallaby and Rory Sarjeant (all three playing in England).

2012

Germany called up the following players:

2013
Germany called up the following players:

2014
Germany called up the following players:

2015
Germany called up the following players:

2016
Germany called up the following players:

2017
Germany called up the following players:

2018
Germany called up the following players:

2019
Germany called up the following players:

Honours
 European Under-18 Rugby Union Championship - B Division
 Champions: 2009
 Runners-up: 2007

European championship

Results
Germany's recent results at the European Championship:

 German wins in bold.

Positions
The team's final positions in the European championship:

References

External links
 German Rugby Federation Official DRV website
 Rugby-Journal website Official publication of the German Rugby Federation
  Totalrugby.de German rugby news and results

European national under-18 rugby union teams
Rugby union